The region of South West England has, since the 2010 general election, 55 parliamentary constituencies which is made up of 15 borough constituencies and 40 county constituencies. 
At that election the Conservative Party held the largest number of constituencies, with 36. The Liberal Democrats had 15 and Labour had 4. At the 2015 general election the Liberal Democrats lost all of their seats (14 to the Conservatives and one to Labour), while the Conservatives gained one seat from Labour, leaving the Conservatives with 51 and Labour with 4. In the 2017 general election, the Conservatives remained, by far, the largest party with 47 seats, though losing three to Labour, who won 7, and one to the Liberal Democrats, who won 1. In the 2019 general election, the Conservatives increased their number of seats to 48 by regaining Stroud from Labour, who held their other six seats, while the Liberal Democrats retained their sole seat in Bath.

Constituencies

Proposed boundary changes 
See 2023 Periodic Review of Westminster constituencies for further details.

Following the abandonment of the Sixth Periodic Review (the 2018 review), the Boundary Commission for England formally launched the 2023 Review on 5 January 2021. The Commission calculated that the number of seats to be allocated to the South West region will increase by 3, from 55 to 58. Initial proposals were published on 8 June 2021 and, following two periods of public consultation, revised proposals were published on 8 November 2022. Final proposals will be published by 1 July 2023.

Under the revised proposals, the following constituencies for the region would come into effect at the next general election:

Results history 
Primary data source: House of Commons research briefing - General election results from 1918 to 2019

2019 
The number of votes cast for each political party who fielded candidates in constituencies comprising the South West region in the 2019 general election were as follows:

Percentage votes 

Key:

CON - Conservative Party, including National Liberal Party up to 1966

LAB - Labour Party

LIB - Liberal Party up to 1979; SDP-Liberal Alliance 1983 & 1987; Liberal Democrats from 1992

UKIP/Br - UK Independence Party 2010 to 2017 (included in Other up to 2005 and in 2019); Brexit Party in 2019

Green - Green Party of England and Wales (included in Other up to 2005)

Seats 

Key:

CON - Conservative Party, including National Liberal Party up to 1966

LAB - Labour Party

LIB - Liberal Party up to 1979; SDP-Liberal Alliance 1983 & 1987; Liberal Democrats from 1992

OTH - 1945 - (1) Independent Progressive (Vernon Bartlett); (2) Independent National (Daniel Lipson)

Former constituencies

Abolished in 2010
Bridgwater → Bridgwater and West Somerset
Falmouth and Camborne → Camborne and Redruth, Truro and Falmouth
Northavon → Thornbury and Yate, Filton and Bradley Stoke 
Plymouth Devonport → Plymouth Sutton and Devonport, Plymouth Moor View
Plymouth Sutton → Plymouth Sutton and Devonport, Plymouth Moor View
Taunton → Taunton Deane
Teignbridge → Newton Abbot, Central Devon
Truro and St Austell → Truro and Falmouth, St Austell and Newquay
Wansdyke → North East Somerset
Westbury → South West Wiltshire, Chippenham
Woodspring → North Somerset

Abolished in 1997
Cirencester and Tewkesbury → Cotswold, Tewkesbury
Plymouth Drake → Plymouth Sutton
Swindon → North Swindon, South Swindon
West Gloucestershire → Forest of Dean, Tewkesbury

See also
 List of United Kingdom Parliament constituencies
 List of parliamentary constituencies in Avon
 List of parliamentary constituencies in Cornwall
 List of parliamentary constituencies in Devon
 List of parliamentary constituencies in Dorset
 List of parliamentary constituencies in Gloucestershire
 List of parliamentary constituencies in Somerset
 List of parliamentary constituencies in Wiltshire

Notes

References